Bagryana is a crater on Mercury.  Its name was adopted by the International Astronomical Union (IAU) in 2017, after Bulgarian poet Elisaveta Bagryana.

Bagryana lies on the southern margin of Apārangi Planitia.

References

Impact craters on Mercury